Yanshan  station is a station on and the western terminus of the Yanfang Line of the Beijing Subway. It was opened on 30 December 2017, and is the westernmost station of the Beijing Subway.

Station Layout 
The station has an elevated island platform.

Exits 
There are 2 exits, lettered A and B. Both exits are accessible.

Gallery

References 

Beijing Subway stations in Fangshan District